The 2017 Iranian Super Cup was the 3rd Iranian Super Cup, held on 21 July 2017 between the 2016–17 Persian Gulf Pro League champions Persepolis and the 2016–17 Hazfi Cup winners Naft Tehran.

Persepolis won the Iranian Super Cup 3–0 for the first time.

Match

References

Supercup
Persepolis F.C. matches
2017